The Jazz Soul of Little Stevie is the debut studio album by Stevie Wonder (then billed as Little Stevie Wonder) released in September 1962 on the Tamla Motown label.

The album showcases the 12-year-old Wonder's talents as a composer and instrumentalist and is one of two Wonder studio albums on which he does not sing (the other being Eivets Rednow); he is featured on percussion, the keyboard, and the harmonica.  Wonder's mentors Clarence Paul and Henry Cosby wrote and produced the material on The Jazz Soul of Little Stevie Wonder, with the young Wonder himself also co-writing two of the compositions. The original studio version of "Fingertips" is included on the album; a live version would become Wonder's first hit single.

Track listing

Side one
"Fingertips" (Henry Cosby, Clarence Paul) – 3:00 - Little Stevie on bongos
"The Square" (Cosby, Paul) – 3:03 - Little Stevie on harmonica
"Soul Bongo" (Marvin Gaye, Paul) – 2:20 - Little Stevie on bongos
"Manhattan at Six" (Cosby, Paul) – 3:47 - Little Stevie on drums
"Paulsby" (Cosby, Paul) – 2:47 - Little Stevie on organ and harmonica

Side two
"Some Other Time" (Cosby, Paul) – 5:11 - Little Stevie on harmonica
"Wondering" (Paul, Stevie Wonder) – 2:51 - Little Stevie on organ
"Session Number 112" (Paul, Wonder) – 3:18 - Little Stevie on piano and harmonica
"Bam" (Berry Gordy, Jr.) – 3:34 - Little Stevie on harmonica

References

 "The Jazz Soul Of Little Stevie" at Discogs.

1962 debut albums
Stevie Wonder albums
Albums produced by Henry Cosby
Albums produced by Clarence Paul
Tamla Records albums
Instrumental albums
Albums recorded at Hitsville U.S.A.